James Comerford ( – ), was an Australian trade unionist, activist, writer and miner who was national general secretary of the Australian Coal and Shale Employees' Federation and served as its Northern New South Wales president from 1953 to 1973.

Biography

Early life

James Comerford was born in 1913 in Glencraig in Fife, Scotland. When Jim was nine his family moved to Kurri Kurri in the northern Hunter Region of New South Wales, Australia after his father had been blacklisted from a Scottish mine. At the age of 13 he got a job at a local newspaper, but he soon left it to work in the mines.

1929-30 lockout and Rothbury riot

When he was 15 he was among the miners in the Rothbury riot of 16 December 1929, when a lockout in the collieries of northern New South Wales led to miners charging the gate of the colliery in or near Rothbury and police opened fire on them in response.

Union career, activism and politics

In 1942 he became the youngest person ever to be elected to the central council of the Australian Coal and Shale Employees' Federation (also known as the Miners' Federation of Australia). He served as its Northern New South Wales president from 1953 until his retirement in 1973, and at various times had other regional and national roles including national general secretary. He was also active in support of various causes including those of the peace movement, adult education, social clubs for workers, union education, retired mineworkers and unemployed workers, and also total abstinence from alcohol as a member of the Independent Order of Rechabites.

Comerford was known to have been a member of the Young Communist League of Australia in 1930 and then the Communist Party of Australia from 1940 to 1959 before joining the Australian Labor Party in 1960; according to his biographer Barbara Heaton he privately remained a Marxist all his life. He was heavily involved in events around the 1949 Australian coal strike and the 1955 Labor Party split.

Retirement and writing

After his retirement in 1973 he wrote extensively. He wrote or cowrote books on several subjects, including Lockout, an account of the 1929-30 lockout and the violence at Rothbury. The University of Newcastle (Australia) made him a Convocation Scholar and a writer-in-residence. At some time between 1997 and his death in 2006 he donated his personal library to the Coalfields Heritage Group of Cessnock, New South Wales, later renamed the Coalfields Local History Association.

Marriage and children
Jim Comerford was married to Mabel Comerford for 70 years. They had a daughter, Jean Andrew.

Death and afterward

Published works

Honours, decorations, awards and distinctions
Along with the appointments as Convocation Scholar and writer-in-residence the University of Newcastle awarded Comerford an honorary Master of Arts. In 1989 he was awarded the Medal of the Order of Australia for service to the trade union movement. In nearby Aberdare the Jim Comerford Memorial Wall was dedicated in 1996 to those who died in the mines in the Northern District of the Construction, Forestry, Maritime, Mining and Energy Union, the present-day successor of the Australian Coal and Shale Employees' Federation. The then Prime Minister of Australia Paul Keating paid tribute to Comerford while unveiling the wall. A bust of Comerford was later put in front of the wall and was dedicated in 2007 by the then Prime Minister Kevin Rudd.

Bibliography

See also

References

External links
 Obituary - James (Jim) Comerford - Obituaries Australia
 Biography - James (Jim) Comerford - People Australia
 Grumpy Old Journo: A pit boy's progress
 Scottish national identities among inter-war migrants in North America and Australasia
 Personal narratives of Irish and Scottish migration, 1921–65: For spirit and adventure'
 Comerford Family History: Comerford Profiles 31: Jim Comerford (1913-2006), Australian trade unionist

1913 births
2006 deaths
20th-century Australian male writers
Australian trade union leaders
Australian coal miners
Australian people of Irish descent
Australian people of Scottish descent
Scottish emigrants to Australia
People from the Hunter Region
Writers from Fife
Communist Party of Australia members
Recipients of the Medal of the Order of Australia